The 2019 Fiji Football Cup (FF Cup) was the 29th edition of FF Cup. The tournament started with the eight participants from the 2019 Fiji Premier League. The tournament was won by Nadi who defeated Suva in the final by 2-1.

Teams 
The eight teams from 2019 Fiji Premier League participated in the 2019 FF Cup.

Participants

Group stage 
The 8 teams were split in two groups with four teams each. The top two advanced to semifinal.

Group A

Results

Group B

Results

Semi-finals

3rd-place match

Final

See also 
 2019 Vodafone Senior League
 2019 Fiji Premier League
 2019 Fiji Battle of the Giants

References

External links
RSSSF

Fiji Football Association Cup Tournament
Battle of the Giants